Rock was a Yugoslav music magazine, published from 1982 to 1990.

History
Rock first appeared in April 1982 as Rock 82. Initially, Rock 82 was a supplement of NIP Politika's comic magazine Strip 82; the back cover of Strip 82 being the front cover of Rock 82, printed in an unusual 11x30cm magazine format. Rock 82s first editor-in-chief as well as its initiator was rock critic . In an interview for the Rockovnik documentary series, Popović recalled:

From January 1983, Rock began being published as an independent periodical, printed in tabloid newspaper format. Then, in March 1985, it started getting printed in magazine format. In 1985, 7-inch single with the charity song "Za milion godina", the Yugoslav contribution to Live Aid, was released with the magazine.

Popović was succeeded by Vladislav Bajac, who in turn got succeeded by Dragan Todorović. From October 1988, the magazine was edited by Saša Gajević, and published under the name Pop Rock'''. The last, 161st issue, was released on December 13, 1990.

Journalists and contributors
Some of the journalists and contributors to Rock'' include:
 Dejan Cukić
 Snežana Golubović
 Jadranka Janković
 Petar Janjatović
 
 Ivana Marković
 
 Goran Vejvoda
 Dušan Vesić

References

1982 establishments in Yugoslavia
1990 disestablishments in Yugoslavia
Defunct magazines published in Yugoslavia
Magazines established in 1982
Magazines disestablished in 1990
Serbian-language magazines
Music magazines published in Serbia
Serbian rock music
Yugoslav rock music